Maged Ali Abdel Rahman Hany (born 1 April 2003) is a football midfielder who plays for Zamalek.

References

External links

Living people
2003 births
Egyptian footballers
Egypt youth international footballers
Zamalek SC players
Association football midfielders